Bagous elegans is a species of weevils in the subfamily Bagoinae.

References

External links 

Curculionidae
Beetles described in 1801